ITV Daytime is a British programming block on ITV, programmed by ITV plc. The block of programming begins at 6:00 am from Monday to Friday, and includes the ITV Breakfast programme Good Morning Britain.

Current programming (as of January 2023)

Presenters

References 

ITV (TV network)